Hendthi Helidare Kelabeku is a 1993 Indian Kannada-language comedy drama film, directed by Relangi Narasimha Rao and is a remake of the Tamil film Pondatti Sonna Kettukanum. The film stars Malashri and Harish Kumar, with Dwarakish, Srikanth, Balaraj and Umashri in key supporting roles.

The film's music was composed by Chakravarthy and the audio was launched on the Lahari Music banner.

Cast 

Malashri as Mala, Eeshwaryya's youngest daughter-in-law, Subbu's Wife
Harish Kumar as Subbu aka Subramanya, Mala's Husband, Eeshwaryya's youngest son 
Srinath as Mala's Father
Dwarakish as Eeshwarayya
Umashree as Eeshwaryya's wife
Ramesh Bhat as Eeshwaryya's Eldest Son, Sarala's Husband
Kovai Sarala as Sarala, Eeshwaryya's Eldest daughter-in-law 
Balaraj as Eeshwaryya's Second Son, Prema's Husband 
Srikanth as Mohan, Eeshwaryya's third son, Vani's Husband
Sathyabhama as Ganga Bai
Kunigal Nagabhushan

Soundtrack 
The music of the film was composed by Chakravarthy and the lyrics were written by Chi. Udaya Shankar.

References 

1993 films
1990s Kannada-language films
1993 comedy-drama films
Kannada remakes of Tamil films
Indian comedy-drama films
Films scored by K. Chakravarthy
Films directed by Relangi Narasimha Rao